Castle Loch is a large, shallow, freshwater loch in Dumfries and Galloway, in the Southern Uplands of south-west Scotland. The loch has 2 islets.

Survey
The loch was surveyed in 1903 by James Murray and later charted  as part of Sir John Murray's Bathymetrical Survey of Fresh-Water Lochs of Scotland 1897-1909.

References

Lochs of Dumfries and Galloway
Freshwater lochs of Scotland